Nascimento may refer to:

 Nascimento, a Portuguese surname
 Nascimento, an album by Milton Nascimento
 Nascimento (footballer, born 1937), retired football goalkeeper
 Nascimento (footballer, born 1960), retired football midfielder